Richard ("Ric") Forman is an American winemaker, vineyard manager, and consultant, who has made contributions to the rise of Napa Valley as one of the premier winemaking regions of the world.

Details
Forman is credited with introducing vintage-dated Merlot, and (along with Dick Graff) barrel fermentation of white wines, to California.  Forman was long-time winemaker of Sterling Vineyards.  After leaving Sterling he helped found Newton Vineyard. He was also instrumental in the founding of Duckhorn Vineyards.
Later, he befriended rancher David Abreu, with whom he co-founded both Abreu Vineyards Management, a vineyard management company, and a winery, Abreu Vineyards.  Forman is considered an expert in non-malolactic Chardonnay.

References

Living people
Wine critics
American winemakers
Food and drink in the San Francisco Bay Area
People from Napa County, California
Year of birth missing (living people)